SFWU may refer to:

 Service & Food Workers Union, a trade union in New Zealand
 Seychelles Federation of Workers' Unions, a national trade union center in Seychelles